The Austrian Men's Volleyball Bundesliga is a men's volleyball competition organized by the Austrian Volleyball Federation (ÖVV), it was created in 1952.

History 
9 teams participated in the 2020/21 championship in the 1st Bundesliga: Zadruga Aich-Dob (Bleiburg), Union Raiffeisen (Zwettl am Rodle), Holding (Graz), Niederosterreich (Amstetten), Weberzeile (Ried im Innkrais), Sokol (Vienna), Weitz (Gleisdorf), Wörther See-Leuven (Klagenfurt), Raiffeisen (Hartberg). The champion title was won by Holding, which won the final against Zadrugu Aykh-Dob 4-0 (3: 2, 3: 1, 3: 1, 3: 1). 3rd place was taken by Niederosterreich.

Winners list

References

External links
 Österreichischer Volleyball Verband
 Hall of Fame

 

Austria
Sports leagues established in 1953
1953 establishments in Austria
Volleyball in Austria
Professional sports leagues in Austria